Renaissance Broadcasting, founded in 1982 by Michael Finkelstein, was a company that owned several UHF television stations, it was sold to Tribune Broadcasting in 1997. The company was headquartered in Greenwich, Connecticut.

History
Renaissance Broadcasting began operations in February 1982 under the name Odyssey Media Partners, a partnership headed by Greenwich businessman Michael Finkelstein with the purchase of WATR-TV in Waterbury, Connecticut, an NBC affiliate that was nearing disaffiliation after New Britain-based WVIT upgraded its transmitter to cover the whole state of Connecticut. For the previous five years or so, the Hartford/New Haven television market had been without a general independent station after the donation by RKO General of WHCT-TV to Pastor Ray Schoch's Faith Center in 1972. That station gradually evolved from a mix of about 15 hours a day of general entertainment and religious programming from 1973 to mostly religious shows and on the air about 8 hours a day by 1977. Dr. Eugene Scott took over Faith Center in 1975 and WHCT was only running Doctor Gene Scott programming by 1981. This left a massive hole in the market and the rise of cable television had Connecticut viewers watching independent stations from New York City and Boston; however, a hole for a locally-based independent station in the market—the largest without such a station—existed. However, the Hartford/New Haven market still had 2 NBC affiliates. 

When WATR-TV's affiliation with NBC expired in March 1982, the station filled that hole and took on the new calls of WTXX (now WCCT-TV), a general entertainment independent who would soon undergo their own upgrade to cover the entire state. As the only independent in the state, WTXX was an instant success and the success allowed Odyssey to sign on a second station, WDZL (now WSFL-TV) channel 39 in Miami, later that year. Unlike Connecticut, Miami had a more competitive TV market including an established VHF independent station and a wider variety of stations on the air. As a result, WDZL was profitable but not to the degree as WTXX had been.

The success of WTXX and WDZL led Finkelstein and partners to expand into other markets. In 1986, the group started buying existing stations, and reincorporated Odyssey Media Partners as Renaissance Broadcasting. That year, Renaissance would buy three stations: NBC affiliate WPCQ channel 36 (now WCNC-TV) in Charlotte from Group W, and independent stations WPMT channel 43 in York/Harrisburg/Lancaster from Idaho-based Mohawk Broadcasting and KTXL channel 40 in Sacramento from Camellia City Telecasters, the latter two of which became Fox affiliates in lieu of being outbid for the affiliation in Connecticut and Miami. 

In 1987, after failing to acquire WTVJ channel 4 (now 6) in Miami upon CBS announcing plans to buy WCIX (which became a Fox affiliate), Telepictures (now part of Warner Bros. Television) opted to exit broadcast television altogether, selling its only station, Fox affiliate WPGH-TV channel 53 in Pittsburgh, which they purchased from Meredith Corporation in 1986, to Renaissance. The private equity firm Warburg Pincus became an investor at this time. Two years later, they sold WPCQ to the Providence Journal Company (which later merged with Belo Corporation). 

In 1989, the Miami market was in for a huge shakeup: NBC purchased WTVJ and pulled its affiliation from WSVN channel 7, CBS purchased WCIX (now WFOR-TV) and moved its affiliation there, and the Fox affiliation moved to WSVN. Much of WCIX's syndicated programming moved to WDZL, as WSVN opted to go towards a news-intensive format like that of many Fox affiliates today. 

In 1990, Renaissance put WPGH up for sale, because it was losing money from overpaying for programming so that WPTT channel 22 (now WPNT) could not air it. In August 1991, the Sinclair Broadcast Group bought WPGH, moved some of WPTT's programming there, and sold WPTT to its general manager, Eddie Edwards. WPTT then began airing Home Shopping Network programming nearly 24 hours a day, but in January 1992 Sinclair began managing the station through a local marketing agreement (or LMA), airing 10 hours of shows and movies that WPGH had no time to air, the deal became full-time by 1996,  with Sinclair buying channel 22 outright in 2001 

In 1993 Renaissance merged with Chase Broadcasting, which owned Fox affiliates KDVR channel 31 in Denver, WTIC-TV channel 61 in Hartford, WPTY-TV channel 24 in Memphis (now WATN-TV), WATL channel 36 in Atlanta, and WXIN channel 59 in Indianapolis.

The aftermath of the purchase of Chase led to the sale of several stations: WPTY to Clear Channel Communications, WATL to Fox, and WTXX to a Roman Catholic organization called Counterpoint Communications, the latter because duopolies were forbidden at the time. Renaissance wanted a full-time LMA with WTXX, buying most of its broadcast day—except for a couple hours in which air Catholic shows would air—but WTXX only wanted to sell eight hours per day while airing Home Shopping Network programing for 13 hours and religious shows the rest of the day. As a result, WTXX began an LMA with WVIT instead, airing cartoons and a few syndicated shows. WVIT's owner, Viacom, added UPN programming to WTXX in 1995, as Viacom had owned part of UPN, then in 1996 the LMA became full-time. 

Meanwhile, in 1995, WDZL became an affiliate of The WB Television Network, and that same year Fox swapped its owned-and-operated station in Dallas/Fort Worth, KDAF channel 33, to Renaissance (in exchange for KDVR) after signing an affiliation deal with New World Communications, which owned CBS affiliate KDFW-TV channel 4, although Fox would buy New World a few years later, including a local marketing agreement with independent station KDFI-TV channel 27. KDAF then became a WB affiliate.  KDAF kept Fox Kids (until 1997), all other syndicated shows, and added WB Network shows. Then in 1997, Renaissance sold the entire company to Tribune Broadcasting, including WTIC-TV, WDZL, WPMT, KTXL, KDAF, and WXIN. Also, in 1998, WVIT (which had been sold to NBC), decided to end the local marketing agreement with WTXX. WTXX's new LMA partner was—in all irony—WTIC-TV, which by then was owned by Tribune. Much of the programming airing on WTXX from the LMA with WVIT carried over, and WTIC bought some more shows as well.

Television stations formerly owned by Renaissance Broadcasting
Stations are arranged alphabetically by state and by city of license.

Defunct broadcasting companies of the United States
Defunct television broadcasting companies of the United States
Nexstar Media Group
Defunct companies based in Connecticut
Entertainment companies established in 1982
Mass media companies established in 1982
Companies disestablished in 1997
1982 establishments in Connecticut